I Believed in You is a 1934 American pre-Code drama film directed by Irving Cummings and written by William M. Conselman. The film stars Rosemary Ames, John Boles, Victor Jory, Gertrude Michael, George Meeker and Leslie Fenton. The film was released on February 23, 1934, by Fox Film Corporation.

Plot

Cast       

Rosemary Ames as True Merrill
John Boles as Michael Harrison
Victor Jory as Jim Crowl
Gertrude Michael as Pamela Banks 
George Meeker as Saracen Jones
Leslie Fenton as Russell Storm
Joyzelle Joyner as Vavara
Jed Prouty as Joe Long 
Morgan Wallace as Oliver Lang
Luis Alberni as Giacomo
 Frederik Vogeding as 	Reno
 Walter Walker as Lacy
 Arthur Housman as 	Jerry Hartman
 Louise Beavers as 	Prisoner 
 Robert Walker as Detective
 Ferdinand Gottschalk as 	Musician
 Wini Shaw as 	Crowl's Girlfriend
 Kay Hammond as Poetess 
 Gilbert Emery as 	Pamela's Friend
 Lenita Lane as Novelist
 Vadim Uraneff as 	Candy Vendor
 Niles Welch as 	Painter
 Reginald Simpson as Auto Salesman 
 Charles C. Wilson as 	Magistrate
 Ralph Emerson as Sculptor

References

External links 
 

1934 films
1930s English-language films
Fox Film films
American drama films
1934 drama films
Films directed by Irving Cummings
American black-and-white films
Films scored by Samuel Kaylin
1930s American films